The 2020–21 Northwestern Wildcats women's basketball team represented Northwestern University during the 2020–21 NCAA Division I women's basketball season. The Wildcats were led by 13th-year head coach Joe McKeown. They played their home games at Welsh–Ryan Arena as members of the Big Ten Conference.

They finished the season 16–9, 11–7 in Big Ten play to finish in fifth place.  They received a bye into the Second Round of the Big Ten women's tournament where they defeated Illinois and Michigan before losing to eventual champions Maryland in the Semifinals.  They received an at-large bid to the NCAA tournament.  As the seven seed in the Alamo Regional they defeated ten seed  in the First Round before losing to two seed Louisville in the Second Round to end their season.

Previous season 

The Wildcats finished 26–4, 16–2 in Big Ten play to finish tied for first place.  As the second seed in the Big Ten women's tournament they received a double-bye into the Quarterfinals where they lost to Michigan.  They did not get a chance for further post season play, as the NCAA women's basketball tournament and WNIT were cancelled before they began due to the COVID-19 pandemic.

Roster

Schedule and results

Source:

|-
!colspan=6 style=| Regular season

|-
!colspan=6 style= |Big Ten Women's Tournament

|-
!colspan=6 style= |NCAA tournament

Rankings

The Coaches Poll did not release a Week 2 poll and the AP Poll did not release a poll after the NCAA Tournament.

See also
2020–21 Northwestern Wildcats men's basketball team

References

Northwestern Wildcats women's basketball seasons
Northwestern
Northwestern
Northwestern
Northwestern